Theatre Royal Sydney is a theatre in Sydney, Australia built in 1976 and has offered a broad range of entertainment since the 1990s. The theatre reopened in December 2021 under parent company Trafalgar Entertainment with patrons now able to book tickets directly from the venue itself with its Box Office operating 7 days a week.

Earlier theatres also called the Theatre Royal, on the same site, date back to 1833.

Earlier theatres

First Theatre Royal
The name Theatre Royal had originally been used for a theatre upon which building work commenced in 1827 behind the Royal Hotel by Barnett Levey. This new playhouse was opened on 5 October 1833.  It was closed in March 1838 and a few days later the Royal Victoria Theatre, a much larger building, was opened, with an entrance on Pitt Street, by Joseph Wyatt. Levey's Theatre Royal burned to the ground in 1840 with the "Vic" (Royal Victoria), which abutted the rear, having a narrow escape. However, the Royal Victoria was still destined to be consumed by fire – on 22 July 1880 it was totally destroyed.

Second Theatre Royal
The Prince of Wales Theatre, was built in 1855 and destroyed by fire in 1860, rebuilt and burned down again in 1872. The Prince of Wales Theatre was rebuilt as the next Theatre Royal, which opened in 1875. The Theatre Royal was built in 1875 for producer and manager Samuel Lazar in Castlereagh Street between King and Rowe Street, the other side of which would in 1890 be built the famous Australia Hotel. The theatre was leased by J. C. Williamson's from 1882 to 1978. On 17 June 1892 the auditorium was largely destroyed by fire. This was the third theatre fire on the site. 

It reopened on 7 January 1893 with a much improved electric lighting system. Its interior was substantially remodelled in 1921 by architect Henry Eli White.

Current theatre 
In 1971–72 the theatre, along with the Hotel Australia, and much of the block on which it was situated, was demolished to construct the MLC Centre.  Public agitation and action by construction unions once it was closed to save it resulted in the developer Lendlease incorporating a replacement 1,180-seat theatre into the design. Designed by Harry Seidler in a plain modernist style, along with the rest of the complex, the current Theatre Royal opened in 1976, with entry from King Street, between Pitt Street and Castlereagh Street.

The theatre has hosted a mix of entertainment from dramas, comedies and musicals, with notable productions such productions as The King and I, The Rocky Horror Picture Show and War Horse.

The theatre closed in March 2016 amid development of the MLC Centre and calls for a new larger lyric theatre to be built.

In March 2019, the NSW Government announced it had taken on a 55-year lease of the theatre from the MLC Centre developers, with the intention to re-open the venue with a private operator.

It was announced that the theatre will reopen in late 2021, after it was acquired by Trafalgar Entertainment, the company of British theatre impresarios Sir Howard Panter and Dame Rosemary Squire.

In November 2021, Theatre Royal Sydney opened with its first production, Jagged Little Pill the musical commencing the same week with it proceeded by Girl From The North Country and An American In Paris.

References

 "Reopening of Theatre Royal Sydney marks a ‘new era’ for Australian entertainment". Australasian Leisure Management. 29 November 2021. Retrieved 2 February 2022.

External links
 
 Theatre Royal at sydney-theatre.com
 
  [CC BY-SA]

Theatres in Sydney
1827 establishments in Australia
Sydney central business district
Green bans
Buildings and structures demolished in 1972